The Lamar Softball Complex, built in 2014–15 on the campus of Lamar University, is the home stadium for the Division I (NCAA) Lamar Lady Cardinals softball team. The stadium is located next to the Lamar Soccer Complex.  The initial home game was played in the partially completed stadium with temporary spectator seating on March 6, 2015 against the Houston Baptist Huskies softball team.  The current grandstands were built following the 2014–15 season's conclusion.

Features 
The stadium features permanent seating for 500 fans.  Included in the 500 seat capacity are 150 chair back seats.  To accommodate additional fans, the stadium also features a grass berm located behind the outfield fence.  The berm extends from the left field line to mid right center field.  The stadium also features covered seating, field lighting, bullpens, dugouts, a press box, a covered hitting area, and an electronic scoreboard.  The playing field features a programmable fertilization and irrigation system.

Adjacent to the stadium site is the Lamar Soccer and Softball Complex building which houses separate areas for each sport. The building features coaches offices; home, visitors, and referees locker rooms; team meeting rooms; and training rooms.  Also included is a ticket office, concession and souvenir stands, and restrooms for spectators.

Estimated cost of the softball stadium was between $1.5 million and $2.5 million.  Estimated cost of the Lamar Soccer and Softball Complex building was $3.5 million according to the Texas Higher Education Coordinating Board's Capital Expenditure Plans FY 2009 to 2013 report.

Post season tournaments 
The Lamar Softball Complex was the Region 4 site of the 2017 NISC championship tournament.

Yearly attendance 

Below is the Lady Cardinals' yearly home attendance at the Lamar Softball Complex.

*Note:  Attendance restricted to 119 fans due to COVID19 precautions.
**Note:  Games after March 10, 2020 cancelled due to COVID19 precautions.
***Note:  Temporary seating

Gallery

References

External links

 Lady Cardinals Softball Official Website

Lamar Lady Cardinals softball
College softball venues in the United States
Sports venues in Beaumont, Texas
Lamar Cardinals and Lady Cardinals sports venues
Softball venues in Texas
2015 establishments in Texas
Sports venues completed in 2015